Minuscule 384 (in the Gregory-Aland numbering), α 355 (Soden), is a Greek minuscule manuscript of the New Testament, on paper. Palaeographically it has been assigned to the 13th century. 
Formerly it was labeled by 59a and 62p.
It has some marginalia.

Description 

The codex contains the text of the Acts, Catholic epistles, and Pauline epistles on 132 cotton paper leaves. The text is written in one column per page, in 36 lines per page.

It contains Prolegomena, lectionary markings at the margin (for Church reading), incipits, subscriptions at the end of each book, and numbers of stichoi.

The order of books: Acts, Catholic epistles, and Pauline epistles. It contains also Martyrium Pauli.

Text 

The Greek text of the codex is a representative of the Byzantine text-type. Aland placed it in Category V.

History 

There is inscription on the first leaf: "liber hospitalis de Cusa trevirensis dioc. R".

The manuscript was examined by Griesbach (in Acts 11-13, 1 Peter, Romans, Ephesians, 1 Corinthians 1-7) and Bloomfield. C. R. Gregory saw it in 1883.

The manuscript was added to the list of the New Testament manuscripts by Scholz (1794-1852).

Formerly it was labeled by 59a and 62p. In 1908 Gregory gave the number 384 to it.

The manuscript is currently housed at the British Library (Harley MS 5588).

See also 

 List of New Testament minuscules
 Biblical manuscript
 Textual criticism

References

Further reading 

 J. J. Griesbach, Symbolae criticae ad supplendas et corrigendas variarum N. T. lectionum collectiones (Halle, 1793), pp. 160–162. 186.

Greek New Testament minuscules
13th-century biblical manuscripts
Harleian Collection